The Naked DJ is a 2014 Singaporean documentary film directed by Kan Lume about musician and political activist Chris Ho, also known as X' Ho.  Ho travels to China and reflects on Singaporean culture and politics.  The film won the NETPAC Award at the Jogja-NETPAC Asian Film Festival in Indonesia.

Plot 
Musician and political activist Chris Ho travels to mainland China to explore his roots and get a new tattoo.  Filmmaker Kan Lume accompanies him and records Ho's thoughts on Singaporean culture and politics.

Production 
Director Kan Lume said the scenes were not orchestrated, but they were planned to some degree.  Kan introduced Ho to specific people, though the encounters were not scripted.  The crew consisted primarily of Kan and his wife, who edited the film.  Kan was influenced by Eric Rohmer's dialogue-heavy style.

Release 
Kan said that for nearly two years he had trouble screening the film.  He attributed this to the film's low budget but also described how his previous, gay-themed film, Solos, had been banned in Singapore despite its positive international reception, leaving him to believe his films are too controversial to screen in his homeland.  The Naked DJ played at the Jogja-NETPAC Asian Film Festival on December 4, 2014.  It played at the Singapore International Film Festival on December 2, 2015.

Reception 
Maggie Lee of Variety wrote, "This portrait of (and extended political rant by) a Singaporean underground musician could be director Kan Lume's best work yet."

The film won the NETPAC Award at the 2014 Jogja-NETPAC Asian Film Festival.

References

External links 
 

2014 films
2014 documentary films
Singaporean documentary films
Singaporean independent films
2010s Cantonese-language films
2010s English-language films
Thai-language films
Documentary films about rock music and musicians
Documentary films about politics
2010s Mandarin-language films